Hikashu (ヒカシュー) are a Japanese rock band led by pseudo-Kabuki vocalist, Makigami Koichi, known for their highly experimental music. They are often referred to by their alternative English moniker, Hikasu. The group's most recent album, LA LA WHAT, was released in 2021.

Members & Collaborators

Current members
Koichi Makigami (巻上　公一) – voice, bass, cornet, theremin 
Mita Freeman (三田　), f.k.a. Masamichi Mitama (海琳　正道) (1978-1991) – guitar, sampler
Masami Sakaide (坂出　雅海) – bass, laptop computer
Kazuto Shimizu (清水　一登) – piano, bass clarinet
Masaharu Sato (佐藤　正治) – percussion, drums, effect voice

Past members
Yasushi Yamashita (山下　康) – keyboards, drum machine
Makoto Inoue (井上　誠) – mellotron, synthesizers
Satoshi Tobe (戸部　哲) – alto sax
Toshiro Sensui (泉水　敏郎) – percussion
Kazuhiro Nomoto (野本　和浩) – sax, bass clarinet; died 15 December 2003
Masaru Taniguchi (谷口　勝) - drums; died 24 October 1989
Tsuno-Ken (つの犬), a.k.a. Ken Tsunoda (角田　健) – drums
Otomo Yoshihide (大友　良英) – turntables
Torsten Rasch – samplers
Kouzou Nida (新井田　耕造) – drums
Makoto Yoshimori (吉森　信) – keyboards

Discography

Official releases
 Haru [春] (1978) released under the pseudonym "Pre Hikashu"
 Hikashu (1978)
 20seiki no owarini [20世紀の終わりに] (1979) 7 inch single
 Hikashu (1980)
 Shiroi Highway [白いハイウェイ] (1980) 7 inch single
 Natsu [夏] (1980)
 Uwasa No Jinrui [うわさの人類] (1981)
 Watashi No Tanoshimi [私の愉しみ] (1984)
 Mizu Ni Nagashite [水に流して] (1984)
 Soba De Yokereba [そばでよければ] (1985)
 Nani Mo Kamo Odore [なにもかも踊れ] (1987) cassette
 Ningen No Kao [人間の顔] (1988)
 Teichou Na Omotenashi [丁重なおもてなし] (1990)
 Humming Soon [はなうたはじめ](1991)
 Atchi No Me Kotchi No Me [あっちの目こっちの目] (1993)
 Ten Ten [転々] (2006)
 Nyuunen [入念] (2007) maxi single
 Ikirukoto [生きること] (2008)
 Carps and Gaspacho [鯉とガスパチョ] (2009) maxi single
 Ten Ten Ten [転転々] (2009)
 Uragoe [うらごえ] (2012)
 Bankan [万感] (2013)
 Ikite Koi Chinmoku [生きてこい沈黙] (2015)
 Anguri [あんぐり] (2017)
 Nariyamazu [なりやまず] (2020)
 LA LA WHAT [虹から虹へ] (2021)

Compilations
 Hikashu Super (1981)
 Changing Like Myxomycetes [かわってる] (1996) self-covers
 Twin Best (1999)
 Hikashu History (2001)
 Hikashu Super 2 [ヒカシュースーパー2] (2014)

Other albums
 Untitled (1986) an early mini-album
 Hikashu Live (1989) live
 Super Dimension Century Orguss 02 [超時空世紀オーガス02] (1993) soundtrack, reissued in 2012 as Fushigi Wo Mitsumete [不思議をみつめて]
 Retro Active Remix (1996) Hikashu songs remixed by various artists
 Live In Osaka 1-4 (1997) bootleg, four low quality live performances
 Musique Non Stop (1998) a tribute to Kraftwerk featuring Hikashu, Buffalo Daughter, Denki Groove and others
 Radioactive Tribute To Kraftwerk (2002) another tribute, featuring a similar track listing
 End Of The 20th Century (2003) a tribute to Hikashu, featuring Koichi Makigami and others

Inoyama Land
Inoyama Land is the synth-based duo of Yasushi Yamashita and Makoto Inoue

 Danjindan Posidon (1983)
 Pithecanthropus (1999) live
 Inoyama Land (1997)
 Music For Myxomycetes (1998) accompanying music for the World Of Myxomycetes exposition

Makigami Koichi
 Minzoku No Saiten [民族の祭典] (1982)
 Koroshi No Blues [殺しのブルース] (1992)
 Kuchinoha [口の歯] (1995)
 Electric Eel (1998) a collaboration with Anton Bruhin
 Koedarake [声だらけ] (2005)
 Jisatsu Na Disco [自殺なディスコ] (2016) Makigami and Mita Freeman

Makoto Inoue
 Godzilla Legend [ゴジラ伝説] (1983)
 Godzilla Legend II [ゴジラ伝説2] (1984)
 Godzilla Legend III [ゴジラ伝説3] (1984)
 Pygmalio [ピグマリオ] (1985) image album for the Shinji Wada manga of the same name; collaboration with then-current Hikashu lineup, billed as "Makoto Inoue & Hikasu Family"

References

External links
Official site

Japanese alternative rock groups
Japanese techno music groups